Sumo Digital Ltd. is a British video game developer based in Sheffield, England and the principal subsidiary of Sumo Group. The company was founded in 2003 by four former members of the management team of Infogrames Studios and, as of 2018, employs more than 700 people.

Parent company Sumo Group was formed in December 2017 and went public. The developer's model has been described as work for hire.

History 
Sumo Digital was founded in 2003 by Carl Cavers, Paul Porter, Darren Mills and James North-Hearn, four members of the former management team of Infogrames Studios, after that company had been closed down. In 2007, Sumo Digital opened a subsidiary studio in India, called Sumo India. In August 2007, Foundation 9 Entertainment announced that it was acquiring Sumo Digital, wherein North-Hearn became the manager of Foundation 9's European operations. North-Hearn subsequently became chief executive officer for Foundation 9 in March 2008. In November 2014, Sumo Digital's officers completed a management buyout from Foundation 9; in this transaction, Sumo Digital's management was backed by NorthEdge Capital and Foundation 9 was advised by GP Bullhound.

In January 2016, Sumo Digital opened a third development studio, Sumo Nottingham, in Nottingham, England. In January 2018, Sumo Digital acquired CPP Newcastle, the Gateshead-based studio of CCP Games. In August, the company acquired developer The Chinese Room. In February 2019, Sumo Digital acquired work-for-hire video game studio Red Kite Games. A few days later, the studio opened another new studio in Leamington Spa, England, to focus on mobile game development. In October 2019, Sumo North West was opened in Warrington, England; led by Evolution Studios co-founder Scott Kirkland. Lab42 and its 29 employees based in Leamington Spa were added to Sumo Digital's studios when Sumo Group acquired it May 2020. Sumo Digital announced a partnership with the blockchain-company Dapper Labs in October 2020.
In February 2021, Sumo Digital acquired Polish video game studio PixelAnt Games.

Games

Games developed

Games ported

Games co-developed

Cancelled

References

External links
 
 

Companies based in Sheffield
British companies established in 2003
Sumo Group
Video game companies established in 2003
Video game companies of the United Kingdom
Video game development companies
2003 establishments in England
2007 mergers and acquisitions